Hiram "Hank" Williams (September 17, 1923 – January 1, 1953) was an American singer, songwriter, and musician. Regarded as one of the most significant and influential American singers and songwriters of the 20th century, he recorded 55 singles (five released posthumously) that reached the top 10 of the Billboard Country & Western Best Sellers chart, including 12 that reached No. 1 (three posthumously).

Born and raised in Alabama, Williams was given guitar lessons by African-American blues musician Rufus Payne in exchange for meals or money. Payne, along with Roy Acuff and Ernest Tubb, had a major influence on Williams' later musical style. Williams began his music career in Montgomery in 1937, when producers at local radio station WSFA hired him to perform and host a 15-minute program. He formed the Drifting Cowboys backup band, which was managed by his mother, and dropped out of school to devote his time to his career. When several of his band members were drafted during World War II, he had trouble with their replacements, and WSFA terminated his contract because of his alcoholism.

Williams married singer Audrey Sheppard, who was his manager for nearly a decade. After recording "Never Again" and "Honky Tonkin'" with Sterling Records, he signed a contract with MGM Records. In 1947, he released "Move It on Over", which became a hit, and also joined the Louisiana Hayride radio program. One year later, he released a cover of "Lovesick Blues", a huge country hit, which propelled him to stardom on the Grand Ole Opry. He was unable to read or notate music to any significant degree. Among the hits he wrote were "Your Cheatin' Heart", "Hey, Good Lookin'", and "I'm So Lonesome I Could Cry". Years of back pain, alcoholism, and prescription drug abuse severely compromised Williams' health. In 1952, he divorced Sheppard and married singer Billie Jean Horton. He was dismissed by the Grand Ole Opry because of his unreliability and alcoholism.

On New Year's Day 1953, at the age of 29, Williams suffered from heart failure while being driven to his next scheduled concert in Charleston, West Virginia, and died suddenly in the back seat of the car in Oak Hill, West Virginia. Despite his relatively brief career, he is one of the most celebrated and influential musicians of the 20th century, especially in country music. Many artists have covered his songs and he has influenced Elvis Presley, Bob Dylan, Johnny Cash, Chuck Berry, Jerry Lee Lewis, George Jones, George Strait, Charley Pride, the Beatles, and the Rolling Stones, among others. He was inducted into the Country Music Hall of Fame in 1961, the Songwriters Hall of Fame in 1970, the Rock and Roll Hall of Fame in 1987, and the Native American Music Awards Hall of Fame in 1999. The Pulitzer Prize jury awarded him a posthumous special citation in 2010 for his "craftsmanship as a songwriter who expressed universal feelings with poignant simplicity and played a pivotal role in transforming country music into a major musical and cultural force in American life".

Early life

Hank Williams was born Hiram Williams on September 17, 1923, in the rural community of Mount Olive in Butler County, Alabama. He was the third child of Jessie Lillybelle "Lillie" (née Skipper) (1898–1955) with Elonzo Huble "Lon" Williams (1891–1970). Elonzo was a railroad engineer for the W. T. Smith lumber company and was drafted during World War I, serving from July 1918 to June 1919. He was severely injured after falling from a truck, breaking his collarbone and suffering a severe blow to the head. The family's first child, Ernest Huble Williams, was born on July 5, 1921; he died two days later. They later had a daughter named Irene. Williams was named after Hiram I of the Book of Kings. His name was misspelled as "Hiriam" on his birth certificate, which was prepared and signed when he was 10 years old. 

As a child, Williams was nicknamed "Harm" by his family and "Herky" or "Skeets" by his friends. He was born with spina bifida occulta, a birth defect of the spinal column, which gave him lifelong pain; this became a factor in his later alcohol and drug abuse. Williams' father was frequently relocated by the lumber company railway for which he worked, and the family lived in many southern Alabama towns. In 1930, when Williams was seven years old, Elonzo began experiencing facial paralysis. At a Veterans Affairs clinic in Pensacola, Florida, doctors determined that the cause was a brain aneurysm, and Elonzo was sent to the VA Medical Center in Alexandria, Louisiana. He remained hospitalized for eight years, rendering him mostly absent throughout Williams' childhood. From that time on, Lillie assumed responsibility for the family.

In the fall of 1934, the Williams family moved to Greenville, Alabama, where Lillie opened a boarding house next to the Butler County courthouse. In 1935, they settled in Garland, Alabama, where Lillie opened a new boarding house; they later moved with Williams' cousin Opal McNeil to Georgiana, Alabama, where Lillie took several side jobs to support the family despite the bleak economic climate of the Great Depression. She worked in a cannery and served as a night-shift nurse in the local hospital. Their first house burned down, and the family lost their possessions. They moved to a new house on the other side of town on Rose Street, which Williams' mother soon turned into another boarding house. The house had a small garden on which they grew diverse crops that Williams and his sister Irene sold around Georgiana. At a chance meeting in Georgiana, Williams met U.S. Representative J. Lister Hill while Hill was campaigning across Alabama. He told Hill that his mother was interested in talking to him about his problems and her need to collect Elonzo's disability pension. With Hill's help, the family began collecting the money. Despite his medical condition, the family managed fairly well financially throughout the Great Depression.

There are several versions of how Williams got his first guitar. His mother stated that she bought it with money from selling peanuts, but many other prominent residents of the town claimed to have been the one who purchased the guitar for him. While living in Georgiana, Williams met Rufus "Tee-Tot" Payne, a street performer. Payne gave Williams guitar lessons in exchange for money or meals prepared by Lillie. Payne's base musical style was blues. Payne taught Williams chords, chord progressions, bass turns, and the musical style of accompaniment that he would use in most of his future songwriting. Later on, Williams recorded "My Bucket's Got a Hole in It", one of the songs that Payne taught him. His musical style contained influences from Payne along with several other country influences, among them Jimmie Rodgers, Moon Mullican, and Roy Acuff. In 1937, Williams got into a fight with his physical education teacher about exercises the coach wanted him to do. His mother subsequently demanded that the school board terminate the coach; when they refused, the family moved to Montgomery, Alabama. Payne and Williams lost touch, though Payne also eventually moved to Montgomery, where he died in poverty in 1939. Williams later credited him as his only teacher.

Career

1930s

In July 1937, the Williams and McNeils opened a boarding house on South Perry Street in downtown Montgomery. It was at this time that Williams decided to change his name informally from Hiram to Hank. During the same year, he participated in a talent show at the Empire Theater. He won the first prize of $15, singing his first original song "WPA Blues". Williams wrote the lyrics and used the tune of Riley Puckett's "Dissatisfied".

He never learned to read music; instead he based his compositions in storytelling and personal experience.
After school and on weekends, Williams sang and played his Silvertone guitar on the sidewalk in front of the WSFA radio studio. His recent win at the Empire Theater and the street performances caught the attention of WSFA producers who occasionally invited him to perform on air. So many listeners contacted the radio station asking for more of "the singing kid", possibly influenced by his mother, that the producers hired him to host his own 15-minute show twice a week for a weekly salary of US$15.

In August 1938, Elonzo Williams was temporarily released from the hospital. He showed up unannounced at the family's home in Montgomery. Lillie was unwilling to let him reclaim his position as the head of the household. Elonzo stayed to celebrate his son's birthday in September before he returned to the medical center in Louisiana. Williams' mother had claimed that he was dead.

Williams' successful radio show fueled his entry into a music career. His salary was enough for him to start his own band, which he dubbed the Drifting Cowboys. The original members were guitarist Braxton Schuffert, fiddler Freddie Beach, and comedian Smith "Hezzy" Adair. James E. (Jimmy) Porter was the youngest, being only 13 when he started playing steel guitar for Williams. Arthur Whiting was also a guitarist for the Drifting Cowboys. The band traveled throughout central and southern Alabama performing in clubs and at private gatherings. James Ellis Garner later played fiddle for him. Lillie Williams became the Drifting Cowboys' manager. Williams dropped out of school in October 1939 so that he and the Drifting Cowboys could work full-time. Lillie Williams began booking show dates, negotiating prices and driving them to some of their shows. Now free to travel without Williams' schooling taking precedence, the band could tour as far away as western Georgia and the Florida Panhandle. The band started playing in theaters before the start of the movies and later in honky-tonks. Williams' alcohol use started to become a problem during the tours; on occasion he spent a large part of the show revenues on alcohol. Meanwhile, between tour schedules, Williams returned to Montgomery to host his radio show.

1940s

The American entry into World War II in 1941 marked the beginning of hard times for Williams. While he was medically disqualified from military service after suffering a back injury caused by falling from a bull during a rodeo in Texas, his band members were all drafted to serve. Many of their replacements refused to play in the band due to Williams' worsening alcoholism. He continued to show up for his radio show intoxicated, so in August 1942 the WSFA radio station fired him for "habitual drunkenness". During one of his concerts, Williams met his idol, Grand Ole Opry star Roy Acuff backstage, who later warned him of the dangers of alcohol, saying, "You've got a million-dollar talent, son, but a ten-cent brain."

He worked for the rest of the war for a shipbuilding company in Mobile, Alabama, as well as singing in bars for soldiers. In 1943, Williams met Audrey Sheppard at a medicine show in Banks, Alabama. Williams and Sheppard lived and worked together in Mobile. Sheppard later told Williams that she wanted to move to Montgomery with him and start a band together and help him regain his radio show. The couple were married in 1944 at a Texaco Station in Andalusia, Alabama, by a justice of the peace. The marriage was technically invalid, since Sheppard's divorce from her previous husband did not comply with the legally required 60-day trial reconciliation.

In 1945, when he was back in Montgomery, Williams started to perform again for the WSFA radio station. He wrote songs weekly to perform during the shows. As a result of the new variety of his repertoire, Williams published his first songbook, Original Songs of Hank Williams. The book only listed lyrics, since its main purpose was to attract more audiences, though it is also possible that he did not want to pay for transcribing the notes. It included 10 songs: "Mother Is Gone", "Won't You Please Come Back", "My Darling Baby Girl" (with Audrey Sheppard), "Grandad's Musket", "I Just Wish I Could Forget", "Let's Turn Back the Years", "Honkey-Tonkey", "I Loved No One But You", "A Tramp on the Street", and "You'll Love Me Again". With Williams beginning to be recognized as a songwriter, Sheppard became his manager and occasionally accompanied him on duets in some of his live concerts.

On September 14, 1946, Williams auditioned for Nashville's Grand Ole Opry, but was rejected. After the failure of his audition, Williams and Audrey Sheppard attempted to interest the recently formed music publishing firm Acuff-Rose Music. Williams and his wife approached Fred Rose, the president of the company, during one of his habitual ping-pong games at WSM radio studios. Audrey Williams asked Rose if her husband could sing a song for him on that moment, Rose agreed, and he liked Williams' musical style. Rose signed Williams to a six-song contract, and leveraged this deal to sign Williams with Sterling Records. On December 11, 1946, in his first recording session, he recorded "Wealth Won't Save Your Soul", "Calling You", "Never Again (Will I Knock on Your Door)", and "When God Comes and Gathers His Jewels", which was misprinted as "When God Comes and Fathers His Jewels". The recordings "Never Again" and "Honky Tonkin'" became successful, and earned Williams the attention of MGM Records.

Williams signed with MGM Records in 1947 and released "Move It on Over"; considered an early example of rock and roll music, the song became a country hit. In 1948, he moved to Shreveport, Louisiana, and he joined the Louisiana Hayride, a radio show broadcast that propelled him into living rooms all over the Southeast appearing on weekend shows. Williams eventually started to host a show on KWKH and started touring across western Louisiana and eastern Texas, always returning on Saturdays for the weekly broadcast of the Hayride. After a few more moderate hits, in 1949 he released his version of the 1922 Cliff Friend and Irving Mills song "Lovesick Blues", made popular by Rex Griffin. Williams' version became a hit; the song stayed at number one on the Billboard charts for four consecutive months, and it gained Williams a place in the Grand Ole Opry. On June 11, 1949, Williams made his debut at the Grand Ole Opry, where he became the first performer to receive six encores. He brought together Bob McNett (guitar), Hillous Butrum (bass), Jerry Rivers (fiddle) and Don Helms (steel guitar) to form the most famous version of the Drifting Cowboys, earning an estimated $1,000 per show. That year Audrey Williams gave birth to Randall Hank Williams (Hank Williams Jr.). During 1949, he joined the first European tour of the Grand Ole Opry, performing in military bases in England, Germany and the Azores. Williams released seven hit songs after "Lovesick Blues", including "Wedding Bells", "Mind Your Own Business", "You're Gonna Change (Or I'm Gonna Leave)", and "My Bucket's Got a Hole in It".

1950s

In 1950, Williams began recording as "Luke the Drifter" for his religious-themed recordings, many of which are recitations rather than singing. Fearful that disc jockeys and jukebox operators would hesitate to accept these unusual recordings, Williams used this alias to avoid hurting the marketability of his name. Although the real identity of Luke the Drifter was supposed to be anonymous, Williams often performed part of the material of the recordings on stage. Most of the material was written by Williams himself, in some cases with the help of Fred Rose and his son Wesley. The songs depicted Luke the Drifter traveling around from place to place, narrating stories of different characters and philosophizing about life. Some of the compositions were accompanied by a pipe organ.
Around this time Williams released more hit songs, such as "My Son Calls Another Man Daddy", "They'll Never Take Her Love from Me", "Why Should We Try Anymore", "Nobody's Lonesome for Me", "Long Gone Lonesome Blues", "Why Don't You Love Me", "Moanin' the Blues", and "I Just Don't Like This Kind of Living". In 1951, "Dear John" became a hit, but it was the flip side, "Cold, Cold Heart", that became one of his most recognized songs. A pop cover version by Tony Bennett released the same year stayed on the charts for 27 weeks, peaking at number one.

Williams' career reached a peak in the late summer of 1951 with his Hadacol tour of the U.S. with Bob Hope and other actors. On the weekend after the tour ended, Williams was photographed backstage at the Grand Ole Opry signing a motion picture deal with MGM. In October, Williams recorded a demo, "There's a Tear in My Beer" for a friend, "Big Bill Lister", who recorded it in the studio. On November 14, 1951, Williams flew to New York with his steel guitar player Don Helms where he appeared on television for the first time on The Perry Como Show. There he sang "Hey Good Lookin'", and the next week Como opened the show singing the same song, with apologies to Williams.

In November 1951, Williams fell during a hunting trip with his fiddler Jerry Rivers in Franklin, Tennessee. The fall reactivated his old back pains. He later started to consume painkillers, including morphine, and alcohol to help ease the pain. On May 21, he had been admitted to North Louisiana Sanitarium for the treatment of his alcoholism, leaving on May 24. On December 13, 1951, he had a spinal fusion at the Vanderbilt University Hospital, being released on December 24. During his recovery, he lived with his mother in Montgomery, and later moved to Nashville with Ray Price.

During the spring of 1952, Williams flew to New York with steel guitarist Don Helms, where he made two appearances with other Grand Ole Opry members on The Kate Smith Evening Hour. He sang "Cold, Cold Heart", "Hey Good Lookin''", "Glory Bound Train" and "I Saw the Light" with other cast members, and a duet, "I Can't Help It (If I'm Still in Love with You)" with Anita Carter. That same year, Williams had a brief extramarital affair with dancer Bobbie Jett, with whom he fathered a daughter, Jett Williams.

In June 1952, he recorded "Jambalaya (On the Bayou)", "Window Shopping", "Settin' the Woods on Fire", and "I'll Never Get out of this World Alive". Audrey Williams divorced him that year; the next day he recorded "You Win Again" and "I Won't be Home No More". Around this time, he met Billie Jean Jones, a girlfriend of country singer Faron Young, at the Grand Ole Opry. As a girl, Jones had lived down the street from Williams when he was with the Louisiana Hayride, and now Williams began to visit her frequently in Shreveport, causing him to miss many Grand Ole Opry appearances.

On August 11, 1952, Williams was dismissed from the Grand Ole Opry for habitual drunkenness and missing shows. He returned to Shreveport, Louisiana, to perform on KWKH and WBAM shows and in the Louisiana Hayride, for which he toured again. His performances were acclaimed when he was sober, but despite the efforts of his work associates to get him to shows sober, his abuse of alcohol resulted in occasions when he did not appear or his performances were poor. In October 1952 he married Billie Jean Jones.

During his last recording session on September 23, 1952, Williams recorded "Kaw-Liga", along with "Your Cheatin' Heart", "Take These Chains from My Heart", and "I Could Never be Ashamed of You". Due to Williams' excesses, Fred Rose stopped working with him. By the end of 1952, Williams started to have heart problems.He met Horace "Toby" Marshall in Oklahoma City, who said that he was a doctor. Marshall had been previously convicted for forgery, and had been paroled and released from the Oklahoma State Penitentiary in 1951. Among other fake titles, he said that he was a Doctor of Science. He purchased the DSC title for $25 from the Chicago School of Applied Science; in the diploma, he requested that the DSc be spelled out as "Doctor of Science and Psychology". Under the name of Dr. C. W. Lemon he prescribed Williams with amphetamines, Seconal, chloral hydrate, and morphine, which made his heart problems worse. His final concert was held in Austin, Texas, at the Skyline Club on December 19.

Personal life

On December 15, 1944, Williams married Audrey Sheppard. It was her second marriage and his first. Their son, Randall Hank Williams (now known as Hank Williams Jr.), was born on May 26, 1949. The marriage was always turbulent and rapidly disintegrated, and Williams developed serious problems with alcohol, morphine, and other painkillers prescribed for him to ease the severe back pain caused by his spina bifida occulta. The couple divorced on May 29, 1952. In June 1952, Williams moved in with his mother, even as he released numerous hit songs such as "Half as Much" in April, "Jambalaya (On the Bayou)" in July, "You Win Again" in September, and "I'll Never Get Out of This World Alive" in November. His substance abuse problems continued to spiral out of control as he moved to Nashville and officially divorced Sheppard. A relationship with a woman named Bobbie Jett during this period resulted in a daughter, Jett Williams, who was born five days after Williams died. His mother adopted Jett, who was made a ward of the state after her grandmother died and then adopted by another couple. Jett did not learn that she was Williams' daughter until the early 1980s.

On October 18, 1952, Williams and Billie Jean Jones were married by a justice of the peace in Minden, Louisiana. It was the second marriage for both (each being divorced with children). The next day, two public ceremonies were held at the New Orleans Civic Auditorium, where 14,000 seats were sold for each. After Williams' death, a judge ruled that the wedding was not legal because Jones' divorce had not become final until 11 days after she married Williams. His first wife and his mother were the driving forces behind having the marriage declared invalid, and they pursued the matter for years. Williams had also married Sheppard before her divorce was final, on the 10th day of a required 60-day reconciliation period.

A man named Lewis Fitzgerald (born 1943) claimed to be Williams' illegitimate son; he was the son of Marie McNeil, Williams' cousin. Fitzgerald was interviewed, and he suggested that Lillie Williams operated a brothel at her boarding house in Montgomery. A friend of the family denied his claims, but singer Billy Walker remembered that Williams mentioned to him the presence of men in the house being led upstairs.

Death

Williams was scheduled to perform at the Municipal Auditorium in Charleston, West Virginia, on December 31, 1952. Advance ticket sales totaled $3,500. That day, Williams could not fly because of an ice storm in the Nashville area; he hired a college student, Charles Carr, to drive him to the concerts. Carr called the Charleston auditorium from Knoxville to say that Williams would not arrive on time owing to the ice storm and was instead ordered to drive Williams to Canton, Ohio, for a New Year's Day concert there. The two arrived at the Andrew Johnson Hotel in Knoxville, Tennessee, and Carr requested a doctor for Williams, who was affected by the combination of the chloral hydrate and alcohol he had consumed on the way to Knoxville. Dr. P. H. Cardwell injected Williams with two shots of vitamin B12 that also contained a quarter-grain of morphine. Carr and Williams checked out of the hotel, but the porters had to carry Williams to the car as he was coughing and hiccuping.

At around midnight on January 1, 1953, when the two crossed the Tennessee state line and arrived in Bristol, Virginia, Carr stopped at a small all-night restaurant and asked Williams if he wanted to eat. Williams said he did not, and those are believed to be his last words. Carr later drove on until he stopped for fuel at a gas station in Oak Hill, West Virginia, where he realized that Williams had been dead for so long that rigor mortis had already set in. The station's owner called the local police chief. In Williams' Cadillac, the police found some empty beer cans and unfinished handwritten lyrics. Dr. Ivan Malinin performed the autopsy at the Tyree Funeral House. He found hemorrhages in the heart and neck and pronounced the cause of death as "insufficiency of the right ventricle of the heart". He also wrote that Williams had been severely beaten and kicked in the groin recently (during a fight in a Montgomery bar a few days earlier), and local magistrate Virgil F. Lyons ordered an inquest into Williams' death concerning a welt that was visible on his head. That evening, when the announcer in Canton announced Williams' death to the gathered crowd, they started laughing because they thought it was just another excuse. After Hawkshaw Hawkins and other performers started singing Williams' song "I Saw the Light" as a tribute to him, the crowd realized that he was indeed dead and began to sing along.

On January 2, Williams' body was transported to Montgomery, Alabama, where it was placed in a silver casket that was displayed at his mother's boarding house for two days. His funeral took place on January 4 at the Montgomery Auditorium, with his casket placed on the flower-covered stage. An estimated 15,000 to 25,000 people passed by the silver casket, and the auditorium was filled with 2,750 mourners. His funeral was said to have been far larger than any ever held for any other citizen of Alabama, and the largest event ever held in Montgomery. Williams' remains are interred at the Oakwood Annex in Montgomery. The president of MGM Records told Billboard magazine that the company got only about five requests for pictures of Williams during the weeks before his death, but over 300 afterwards. The local record shops reportedly sold all their Williams records, and customers were asking for all records ever released by Williams.

Williams' final single, released in November 1952 while he was still alive, was titled "I'll Never Get Out of This World Alive". His song "Your Cheatin' Heart" was written and recorded in September 1952, but released in late January 1953 after his death. The song, backed by "Kaw-Liga", was No. 1 on the country charts for six weeks. It provided the title for the 1964 biographical film of the same name, which starred George Hamilton as Williams. "Take These Chains From My Heart" was released in April 1953 and reached No. 1 on the country charts. Released in July, "I Won't Be Home No More" went to No. 4. Meanwhile, "Weary Blues From Waitin'" reached No. 7.

Legacy

Williams has been called "the King of Country Music" in popular culture. Alabama governor Gordon Persons officially proclaimed September 21 "Hank Williams Day". The first celebration, in 1954, featured the unveiling of a monument at the Cramton Bowl that was later placed at the gravesite of Williams. The ceremony featured Ferlin Husky interpreting "I Saw the Light". Williams had 11 number one country hits in his career ("Lovesick Blues", "Long Gone Lonesome Blues", "Why Don't You Love Me", "Moanin' the Blues", "Cold, Cold Heart", "Hey, Good Lookin'", "Jambalaya (On the Bayou)", "I'll Never Get Out of This World Alive", "Kaw-Liga", "Your Cheatin' Heart", and "Take These Chains from My Heart"), as well as many other top 10 hits.

On February 8, 1960, Williams' star was placed at 6400 Hollywood Boulevard on the Hollywood Walk of Fame. He was inducted into the Country Music Hall of Fame in 1961, and into the Alabama Music Hall of Fame in 1985. When Downbeat magazine took a poll the year after Williams' death, he was voted the most popular country and Western performer of all time—ahead of such giants as Jimmie Rodgers, Roy Acuff, Red Foley, and Ernest Tubb.

In 1977, a national organization of CB truck drivers voted "Your Cheatin' Heart" as their favorite record of all time. In 1987, he was inducted in the Rock and Roll Hall of Fame under the category "Early Influence". He was ranked second in CMT's 40 Greatest Men of Country Music in 2003, behind only Johnny Cash who recorded the song "The Night Hank Williams Came To Town". His son, Hank Jr., was ranked on the same list. In the 1980 Canadian film, Hank Williams: The Show He Never Gave, Williams is portrayed by singer Sneezy Waters.

In 2004, Rolling Stone ranked him number 74 on its list of the 100 Greatest Artists of All Time. In 2005, the BBC documentary series Arena featured an episode on Williams.

Many artists of the 1950s and 1960s, including Elvis Presley, Bob Dylan, Tammy Wynette, David Houston, Jerry Lee Lewis, Merle Haggard, Gene Vincent, Carl Perkins, Ricky Nelson, and Conway Twitty.

In 2011, Williams' 1949 MGM number one hit, "Lovesick Blues", was inducted into the Recording Academy Grammy Hall of Fame. The same year, Hank Williams: The Complete Mother's Best Recordings ...Plus! was honored with a Grammy nomination for Best Historical Album. In 1999, Williams was inducted into the Native American Music Hall of Fame. On April 12, 2010, the Pulitzer Prize Board awarded Williams a posthumous special citation that paid tribute to his "craftsmanship as a songwriter who expressed universal feelings with poignant simplicity and played a pivotal role in transforming country music into a major musical and cultural force in American life". Several members of Williams' descendants became musicians: Hank Williams Jr., daughter Jett Williams, grandsons Hank Williams III and Sam Williams, and granddaughters Hilary Williams and Holly Williams are also country musicians. In July 2020, his granddaughter Katherine (Hank Jr.'s daughter) died in a car crash at the age of 27. His great-grandson Coleman Finchum, son of Hank Williams III, released his debut single credited to IV and the Strange Band in 2021. Meanwhile, Lewis Fitzgerald's son Ricky billed himself as Hank Williams IV following his father's claim of being Williams' son.

In 2006, a janitor of Sony/ATV Music Publishing found in a dumpster the unfinished lyrics written by Williams that had been found in his car the night he died. The worker claimed that she sold Williams' notes to a representative of the Honky-Tonk Hall of Fame and the Rock-N-Roll Roadshow. The janitor was accused of theft, but the charges were later dropped when a judge determined that her version of events was true. The unfinished lyrics were later returned to Sony/ATV, which handed them to Bob Dylan in 2008 to complete the songs for a new album. Ultimately, the completion of the album included recordings by Alan Jackson, Norah Jones, Jack White, Lucinda Williams, Vince Gill, Rodney Crowell, Patty Loveless, Levon Helm, Jakob Dylan, Sheryl Crow, and Merle Haggard. The album, named The Lost Notebooks of Hank Williams, was released on October 4, 2011.

Material recorded by Williams, originally intended for radio broadcasts to be played when he was on tour or for its distribution to radio stations nationwide, resurfaced throughout time. In 1993, a double-disc set of recordings of Williams for the Health & Happiness Show was released. Broadcast in 1949, the shows were recorded for the promotion of Hadacol. The set was re-released on Hank Williams: The Legend Begins in 2011. The album included unreleased songs. "Fan It" and "Alexander's Ragtime Band", recorded by Williams at age 15; the homemade recordings of him singing "Freight Train Blues", "New San Antonio Rose", "St. Louis Blues" and "Greenback Dollar" at age 18; and a recording for the 1951 March of Dimes. In May 2014, further radio recordings by Williams were released. The Garden Spot Programs, 1950, a series of publicity segments for plant nursery Naughton Farms originally aired in 1950. The recordings were found by collector George Gimarc at radio station KSIB in Creston, Iowa. Gimarc contacted Williams' daughter Jett, and Colin Escott, writer of a biography book on Williams. The material was restored and remastered by Michael Graves and released by Omnivore Recordings. The release won a Grammy Award for Best Historical Album.

Williams was portrayed by English actor Tom Hiddleston in the 2016 biopic I Saw the Light, based on Colin Escott's 1994 book Hank Williams: The Biography.

Lawsuits over the estate
After Williams' death, Audrey Williams filed a suit in Nashville against MGM Records and Acuff-Rose. The suit demanded that both of the publishing companies continue to pay her half of the royalties from Hank Williams' records. Williams had an agreement giving his first wife half of the royalties, but allegedly there was no clarification that the deal was valid after his death. Because Williams may have left no will, the disposition of the remaining 50 percent was considered uncertain; those involved included Williams' second wife, Billie Jean Horton and her daughter, and Williams' mother and sister. On October 22, 1975, a federal judge in Atlanta, Georgia, ruled Horton's marriage to Williams was valid and that half of Williams' future royalties belonged to her.

WSM's Mother's Best Flour
In 1951, Williams hosted a 15-minute show for Mother's Best Flour on WSM radio. Due to Williams' tour schedules, some of the shows were previously recorded to be played in his absence. The original acetates made their way to the possession of Jett Williams. Prior to that, duplicates were made and intended to be published by a third party. In February 2005, the Tennessee Court of Appeals upheld a lower court ruling stating that Williams' heirs—son, Hank Williams Jr, and daughter, Jett Williams—have the sole rights to sell his recordings made for a Nashville radio station in 1951.

The court rejected claims made by PolyGram Records and Legacy Entertainment in releasing recordings Williams made for the Mother's Best Flour Show. The recordings, which Legacy Entertainment acquired in 1997, include live versions of Williams' hits and his cover version of other songs. PolyGram contended that Williams' contract with MGM Records, whose back catalogue they owned at the time, prior to current owner Universal Music's absorption of PolyGram the next year, gave them rights to release the radio recordings. A 3-CD selection of the tracks, restored by Joe Palmaccio, was released by Time-Life in October 2008 titled The Unreleased Recordings.

Tributes

Awards

Discography

Footnotes

References

</ref>

Journals

News

Further reading

External links

 
 [ Hank Williams] at AllMusic
 Listing of all Hank Williams's songs and alternatives 
 
 

 
1923 births
1953 deaths
20th-century American singers
Sidney Lanier High School alumni
Alcohol-related deaths in West Virginia
Accidental deaths in West Virginia
American street performers
American country guitarists
American country singer-songwriters
American people of English descent
Baptists from Alabama
Burials in Alabama
Country Music Hall of Fame inductees
Country musicians from Alabama
Drug-related deaths in West Virginia
Grammy Award winners
Grand Ole Opry members
MGM Records artists
Sterling Records (US) artists
Musicians from Montgomery, Alabama
People from Greenville, Alabama
People with spina bifida
Pulitzer Prize winners
American acoustic guitarists
American male guitarists
People from Butler County, Alabama
Guitarists from Alabama
Yodelers
20th-century American guitarists
Blues musicians from Alabama
American rockabilly musicians
American gospel singers
20th-century American male singers
Singer-songwriters from Alabama
Drifting Cowboys members